The 2015 Sun Bowl was a post-season American college football bowl game played on December 26, 2015 at the Sun Bowl Stadium in El Paso, Texas. Played under snowy conditions, it marked the first time the game was played in snowy weather since the 1987 Christmas Day game with West Virginia and Oklahoma State. The 82nd edition of the Sun Bowl featured the Miami Hurricanes of the Atlantic Coast Conference against the Washington State Cougars of the Pac-12 Conference. It began at noon MST and aired on CBS.  It was one of the 2015–16 bowl games that concluded the 2015 FBS football season.  Sponsored by South Korean automotive manufacturer Hyundai Motor Company's American subsidiary, the game was officially known as the Hyundai Sun Bowl. Washington State won 20–14 over the University of Miami.

Teams
The game featured the Miami Hurricanes against the Washington State Cougars.

Miami Hurricanes

The Hurricanes finished 3rd in the ACC Coastal Division. After finishing their regular season 8–4, bowl director Bernie Olivas extended an invitation for the Hurricanes to play in the game, which they accepted.

This was the Hurricanes' second Sun Bowl; they had previously played in the 2010 Sun Bowl, losing to Notre Dame by a score of 33–17.

Washington State Cougars

The Cougars finished 3rd in the Pac-12 North Division. After finishing their regular season 8–4, Olivas extended an invitation for the Cougars to play in the game, which they accepted as well.

This was the Cougars' second Sun Bowl; they had previously won the 2001 Sun Bowl over Purdue by a score of 33–27.

Game summary

Scoring summary

Source:

Statistics

References

2015–16 NCAA football bowl games
2015
2015
2015
2015 in sports in Texas
December 2015 sports events in the United States